Mariusz Fyrstenberg and Marcin Matkowski were the defending champions. They reached the final, but lost to František Čermák and Michal Mertiňák 6–7(3–7), 6–7(5–7).

Seeds

Draw

Draw

References
 Main Draw

Proton Malaysian Open - Doubles
Doubles, 2010 Proton Malaysian Open